Cemal Toktaş (born 14 January 1983) is a Turkish actor. He is a graduate of Istanbul University State Conservatory. Toktaş started his career in 2003 by appearing in the TV film Evlat. He made his cinematic debut with the movie Kara Köpekler Havlarken. Toktaş was also cast in Mahsun Kırmızıgül's Güneşi Gördüm, in which he portrayed the character of Kadri. For his role in this movie, he received the Sadri Alışık Award for Best Supporting Award.

Filmography

References

External links 

1983 births
Male actors from Istanbul
Turkish male film actors
Turkish male television actors
Living people